Sharifabad-e Tajar (also Romanized as Sharīfābād-e Ţajar; also known as Sharīfābād and Sharif Abad Samen) is a village in Haram Rud-e Sofla Rural District, Samen District, Malayer County, Hamadan Province, Iran. At the 2006 census, its population was 176, in 50 families.

References 

Populated places in Malayer County